Moshe Shimon Roth is an Israeli lawyer and politician who is currently a member of the Knesset for United Torah Judaism.

Biography
Roth was born in Crown Heights, New York to Haim Alter Roth, a rabbi who helped establish Kiryat Sanz and Laniado Hospital in Netanya. Roth moved to Israel at the age of 20. Before entering politics, he was a member of the Lanidao Hospital's board, and served as a parliamentary advisor for Meir Porush. He is additionally a licensed lawyer, and practices law in Petah Tikva.

Ahead of the 2021 elections Agudat Yisrael reshuffled its electoral list for the Knesset, giving Roth, a representative of the Sanz dynasty, the fifth spot on its list, in effect the tenth on United Torah Judaism's list. Ahead of the 2022 elections, he was given the ninth spot on United Torah Judaism's list. Roth entered the Knesset on 25 January 2023, following Meir Porush's resignation on 23 January under the Norwegian Law.

Personal lfe
Roth is a member of the Sanz dynasty. He lives in Bnei Brak.

References

External links

Living people
Agudat Yisrael politicians
Politicians from Poughkeepsie, New York
American emigrants to Israel
United Torah Judaism politicians
Members of the 25th Knesset (2022–)
Year of birth missing (living people)